Mielie meal, also known as mealie meal or maize meal, is a relatively coarse flour (much coarser than cornflour or cornstarch) made from maize or mealies in Southern Africa, from the Portuguese milho. It is also known by various other indigenous language names depending on the locality or country. It was originally brought to Africa from the Americas by the Portuguese.

It is a food that was originally eaten by the Voortrekkers during The Great Trek, but has become the staple diet of South Africa. Because of its ability to be stored without refrigeration, it is cheap and abundant in all shops and markets.  It is a staple food in South Africa, Mozambique, Lesotho, Eswatini, Zambia, Zimbabwe, Malawi, Botswana and many other parts of Southern Africa, traditionally made into uphuthu, sour-milk porridge, pap, and also umqombothi (a type of beer).

Pap and phutu

The raw ingredient of mielie meal is added to boiling water, the ratio of which produces either porridge or the firmer pap/nshima/sadza. When making porridge, milk is sometimes used to produce a creamier dish. The porridge usually has a thick texture and is commonly eaten for breakfast in southern Africa.  The firmer pap is eaten with meat and gravy dishes as well as vegetable relishes. It is similar to Italian polenta except that, like grits in the Southern United States, it is usually made of a white rather than a yellow maize variety.

Nutrition 
Mealie meal contains carbohydrates, protein, fat and fiber.

See also

Cornmeal
Grits
Sadza
Samp
List of maize dishes

References

South African cuisine
Staple foods
Maize products
Flour

de:Mielie Pap